Medan–Binjai Toll Road is a toll road connecting to Medan from Binjai. This toll road is part of Banda Aceh-Medan corridor of Trans-Sumatra Toll Road network.

History
On October 10, 2014, the construction of this toll road was inaugurated by the Coordinating Minister for the Economy Chairul Tanjung. While the groundbreaking ceremony was carried out by President Joko Widodo on 27 January 2015. The construction of this toll road was planned to last for 3 years.

The Medan–Kualanamu–Tebing Tinggi Toll Road and Medan–Binjai Toll Road were officially operational after being inaugurated by President Joko Widodo on October 13, 2017. Even though they are already in operation, not all toll roads can be traversed due to land acquisition constraints.

Sections
The toll road is 17 kilometers long, with sections below,
Helvetia-Binjai-Semayang: 10.45 kilometers
Tanjung Mulia-Helvetia: 6.75 kilometers

Exits 

Because this expressway is a part of Trans-Sumatra Toll Road Network, the KM 0 exit is located at the Bakauheni Port. For the sake of simplicity, the distance counter will start around Tanjung Mulia Junction/IC

References

Toll roads in Indonesia
Toll roads in Sumatra

See also
Trans-Sumatra Toll Road